San Francisco Unified School District (SFUSD), established in 1851, is the only public school district within the City and County of San Francisco, and the first in the state of California. Under the management of the San Francisco Board of Education, the district serves more than 55,500 students in more than 160 institutions.

SFUSD utilizes an intra-district school choice system and requires students and parents to submit a selection application. Every year in the fall, the SFUSD hosts a Public School Enrollment Fair to provide families access to information about all the schools in the district. This system is set to change as the school board has resolved to overhaul the system to ensure that more students (at least at the elementary level) are placed at neighborhood schools.

SFUSD has the second highest Academic Performance Index among the seven largest California school districts. Newsweek’s national ranking of "Best High Schools in America" named seven SFUSD high schools among the top five percent in the country in 2007. In 2005, two SFUSD schools were recognized by the federal government as No Child Left Behind Blue-Ribbon Schools.

History
Arlene Ackerman began her tenure as the superintendent of SFUSD on August 1, 2000. In May 2004, the district received $3.3 million for whistleblowing a company defrauding a federal program meant to provide internet to disadvantaged children. In June 2004, Ackerman announced that Progress Energy Inc would pay SFUSD $43.1 million to settle a case accusing its subsidiary, Strategic Resource Solutions, of defrauding the district in an energy deal.

The David Lynch Foundation sponsored the Quiet Time transcendental meditation program at various SFUSD middle and high schools. Visitacion Valley Middle School was the first school to adopt the program in 2007.

SFUSD dropped Columbus Day from the school calendar in January 2017.

In early March 2020, SFUSD temporarily closed Lowell High School and adjacent Lakeshore Elementary School after some family members of students reported respiratory illness at the beginning of the COVID-19 pandemic in the United States. All schools were then closed on March 16th, for 3 weeks, which was subsequently extended until the end of the school year with distance learning implemented for students. In July 2020, they announced that schools would remain closed into the next school year.

On February 3, 2021, San Francisco City Attorney Dennis Herrera announced that, on February 11, he will sue the San Francisco Board of Education, SFUSD, and Superintendent Vincent Matthews for violating state law by not having a plan to "offer classroom-based instruction whenever possible". The lawsuit was the first of its kind, wherein a civil action is filed by a city against its school district over COVID-19 school closures, within the state of California. The suit is supported by Mayor London Breed, who has criticized the Board for focusing on renaming 44 SFUSD schools during the pandemic. Both the Board and Matthews have criticized the suit, calling it wasteful and inaccurate.

On February 15, 2022, three members of the school board were recalled in the 2022 San Francisco Board of Education recall elections.

Student admissions

SFUSD previously practiced a race-based admissions system, presently operates under a choice assignment system.

San Francisco NAACP v. San Francisco Unified School District (1980s) 
In 1983 the NAACP sued the school district and won a consent decree that mandated that no more than 45% of any racial group may make up the percentage of students at a single school. At the time, white and black students were the largest demographic groups in the school district. The decree was intended to benefit black children. When it was discovered that Hispanic children also had low test scores, they were added to the decree's intended beneficiaries.

Ho v. San Francisco Unified School District (1990s) 

In a five-year period ending in 1999, Asian and Latino students were the largest demographic groups in the SFUSD. In 1994, after several ethnic Chinese students were denied admission to programs because too many ethnic Chinese students were present, ethnic Chinese parents sued SFUSD arguing that the system promoted racial discrimination. On April 15, 1998, the Chinese-American group asked a federal appeals court to end the admissions practice. The system required ethnic Chinese students to receive higher scores than other ethnic groups in order to be admitted to Lowell High School, the city's most prestigious public high school. Waldemar Rojas, the superintendent, wanted to keep the decree because the district had received $37 million in desegregation funds. The NAACP had defended the decree. White parents who were against the racial quotas had a tendency to leave San Francisco.

In 1998, a federal appeals court ruled that the race-based criteria should not be ended, but that SFUSD is required to justify why it required higher test scores from ethnic Chinese applicants to gain admission to the school district's most prestigious high school and that the school district is required to prove, during a trial held in the 1999–2000 school year, that segregation is remaining in the school system and that the limitation of the ethnic groups at each school is the only possible remedy. On February 16, 1999, lawyers representing the Chinese parents in Ho v. SFUSD revealed that the school district had agreed to a settlement that removed the previous race-based admission system; William Orrick, the U.S. district judge, had planned to officially announce the news of the settlement the following day. The district planned to implement a "diversity index" in which race was one factor, but in December 1999 Orrick rejected the plan as unconstitutional. Orrick ordered the district to resubmit the plan without race as a factor or to resubmit the plan under the settlement that had been reached with the Chinese parents. In January 2000 the district agreed to remove race as a factor of consideration for admission.

Expiration of the Consent Decree 
Critics of the diversity index created by Ho v. San Francisco Unified School District point out that many schools, including Lowell, have become even less racially diverse since it was enacted.

On November 15, 2005, the United States District Court for the Northern District of California denied a request to extend the Consent Decree, which was set to expire on December 31, 2005, after it had been extended once before to December 31, 2002. The ruling claimed "since the settlement of the Ho litigation [resulting in the institution of the "diversity index"], the consent decree has proven to be ineffective, if not counterproductive, in achieving diversity in San Francisco public schools" by making schools more racially segregated.

As of 2007, SFUSD admission factors include race-neutral aspects, such as the socioeconomic status of a student's family. Lyanne Melendez of KGO-TV wrote in 2007 "but the local courts and the district have found that race-neutral factors haven't worked in San Francisco's case."

Current Student Assignment System (2011-present) 
In 2011, SFUSD instituted a full choice assignment system, but "despite the District’s good intentions, San Francisco’s schools are more segregated now under the current policy than they were thirty years ago." then under the OER system implemented after San Francisco NAACP v. San Francisco Unified School District from 1983 to 2000. Citing choice did not increase diversity, but encourage the opposite, as well as the problem of requiring the time to "shop" for schools.

Elementary Zone-based Assignment System (in development; Fall 2026 earliest implementation) 
In 2018, the school board voted unanimously to create a new plan to address segregation in the district. The plan seeks to focus on diversity, predictibility, and proximity with a zone-based assignment system for Elementary students, and will "also consider the demographic characteristics of each child’s immediate neighborhood when assigning students to help ensure that every school reflects the diversity of the zone it's in."

Current schools

High schools 

Comprehensive schools
Balboa High School
Phillip & Sala Burton High School (located at the former Woodrow Wilson High School campus)
Galileo Academy of Science and Technology
Abraham Lincoln High School
 Thurgood Marshall Academic High School (located at the former Pelton Middle School campus)
Lowell High School
Mission High School
Raoul Wallenberg Traditional High School (located at the former Anza Elementary campus)
George Washington High School

Alternative schools
 The Academy - San Francisco @ McAteer (Small High School by Design; located at the former J. Eugene McAteer High School campus)
Ruth Asawa School of the Arts (SOTA) (specialized arts program; located at the former J. Eugene McAteer High School campus)
Civic Center Secondary School (county; located at the former John Swett Elementary, 727 Golden Gate Ave.)
 City Arts & Technology (charter; located at the Luther Burbank Middle School campus; merged with Leadership High School in 2022)
 Downtown High School (continuation; located at the former Patrick Henry Elementary campus)
Gateway High School (charter; located at the Burl Toler/former Benjamin Franklin Middle School campus)
 Hilltop High School (county; located at the former Sunshine School campus)
 Independence High School
 June Jordan School for Equity (Small School by Design; located at the Luther Burbank Middle School campus)
Leadership High School (charter; located at the former San Miguel Elementary School; merged with City Arts & Technology in 2022))
 John O'Connell High School of Technology
 KIPP San Francisco College Preparatory (charter)
 San Francisco International High School (located at the former Enola Maxwell Middle School campus on DeHaro Street)
Ida B. Wells Continuation High School (formerly Alamo Park Continuation High, Louise M. Lombard High)

Middle schools 
 Aptos Middle School
 James Denman Middle School
 Everett Middle School
 Francisco Middle School
 Gateway Middle School (charter; located at the former Golden Gate Elementary School campus)
 A.P. Giannini Middle School
 Herbert Hoover Middle School
 Dr. Martin Luther King Jr. Academic Middle School
 James Lick Middle School
 Marina Middle School
 Presidio Middle School
 Roosevelt Middle School
 Visitacion Valley Middle School
 Willie L. Brown Jr. Middle School

K-8 schools 
 Buena Vista/Horace Mann Alternative K-8 (located at the Horace Mann Middle School campus)
 Bessie Carmichael/FEC K-8
 Creative Arts Charter (located at the former Golden Gate Elementary)
 Lawton Alternative K-8
 Claire Lilienthal Alternative K-8
Madison Campus (Grades K-2) 3950 Sacramento Street
Winfield Scott Campus (Grades 3–8) 3630 Divisadero Street
 Paul Revere K-8
 Rooftop Alternative Elementary K-8 (formerly Twin Peaks Elementary)
Twin Peaks Campus (Grades K-4) 443 Burnett Avenue (formerly Burnett Campus)
Mayeda Campus (Grades 5–8) 500 Corbett Avenue
 San Francisco Community K-8 (formerly Corbett/Community Elementary and located on Corbett Avenue, where Rooftop's Mayeda campus was built many years later. Now on the site of the former Excelsior School)
 Thomas Edison Charter Academy ("TECA" formerly Edison Elementary, expanded from K-5 to K-8 in 2005)
 Alice Fong Yu Alternative K-8 (located at the former Christopher Columbus Elementary)

K-5 schools 
 Alamo Elementary
 Alvarado Elementary
 Argonne Elementary
 Bryant Elementary (located at the former site of Buena Vista Elementary School since 2011; previously it was located at 1050 York Street in the Mission District)
 Dr. George Washington Carver Elementary
 César Chávez Elementary (formerly Hawthorne Elementary)
 John Yehall Chin Elementary (formerly Washington Irving Elementary)
Chinese Immersion School at De Avila (formerly William R. De Avila Elementary and before 1979 known as Dudley Stone Elementary)
 Clarendon Elementary Second Community (named after the original SF Community which moved to the Excelsior)
 JBBP (Japanese Bilingual Bicultural Program) at Clarendon Elementary
 Cleveland Elementary
 Dr. William L. Cobb Elementary (formerly Emerson Elementary)
 Dr. Charles R. Drew College Preparatory Academy
 El Dorado Elementary
 Dianne Feinstein Elementary (built on the site of the old Parkside Elementary)
 Leonard R. Flynn Elementary (formerly Le Conte Elementary)
 Garfield Elementary 
 Glen Park Elementary
 Grattan Elementary
 Guadalupe Elementary
 Bret Harte Elementary
 Hillcrest Elementary
 Dolores Huerta Elementary (renamed on August 28, 2018, in honor of the co-founder of UFW Dolores Huerta;  formerly Fairmont Elementary, one of the oldest elementary schools in San Francisco)
 Jefferson Elementary
 Francis Scott Key Elementary
 Thomas Starr King Elementary
 Lafayette Elementary
 Lakeshore Elementary
 Gordon J. Lau Elementary (dedicated and renamed on October 30, 1998, formerly Commodore Stockton Elementary [This school was also named the "Oriental School" before 1924.])
Edwin and Anita Lee Newcomer School (renamed and dedicated on August 28, 2018, to honor San Francisco's former mayor and his wife, formerly Chinese Education Center Elementary School, established in 1969)
 Longfellow Elementary
 Frank McCoppin Elementary
 McKinley Elementary
 Malcolm X Academy (formerly Sir Francis Drake Elementary)
 Marshall Elementary (formerly Mission Elementary)
 Harvey Milk Civil Rights Academy (dedicated and renamed June 25, 1996; formerly Douglass School)
 Miraloma Elementary
 Mission Education Center (dual-language immersion TK and newcomer K-5; located in the former Kate Kennedy School)
 Monroe Elementary
 George R. Moscone Elementary
 John Muir Elementary
 New Traditions Elementary (located since 1990 in the former Andrew Jackson Elementary building)
 Jose Ortega Elementary
 Jean Parker Elementary
 Rosa Parks Elementary (reconstituted and renamed in 1995, formerly Raphael Weill Elementary)
 Rosa Parks JBBP (Japanese Bilingual Bicultural Program)
 George Peabody Elementary
 Redding Elementary
 Sanchez Elementary
 San Francisco Public Montessori
 Junipero Serra Elementary
 Sheridan Elementary
 Sherman Elementary
 Commodore Sloat Elementary
 Spring Valley Elementary
 Robert Louis Stevenson Elementary
 Sunnyside Elementary
 Sunset Elementary (formerly Mark Twain Elementary)
 Sutro Elementary
 Edward Robeson (E.R.) Taylor Elementary
 Tenderloin Community School
 Ulloa Elementary
 Visitacion Valley Elementary
 Daniel Webster Elementary
 West Portal Elementary
 Yick Wo (formerly Sarah B. Cooper Elementary)

Closed or merged schools

High schools 
High School of Commerce (1926-1952) including Nourse Auditorium, built in 1927 and named for former Superintendent of Schools Joseph Nourse.
Newton J. Tharp Commercial School (1908-1952) was originally built on Grove Street and then moved to Fell and Franklin Streets in 1913.
International Studies Academy (1984-2016) was located at 655 De Haro Street and was merged into John O'Connell Technical High School.
J. Eugene McAteer High School (1973–2002) was located at 555 Portola Drive and had been built to replace 'Poly' (see below) as the most centrally located high school.
Newcomer High School (was located at the old Laguna Honda Elementary)
Metropolitan Arts and Tech High School (Charter) (-2013) (located at the former Woodrow Wilson High School campus) (merged into City Arts and Technology High School)
Polytechnic High School (1895–1972) 701 Frederick Street across from Kezar Stadium.
Urban Pioneer Experiential Academy (2002–2004)
Woodrow Wilson High School (1963-1996) 400 Mansell Avenue (renamed as Phillip & Sala Burton HS)

Middle schools 
Aim High Academy, 2003-2006 (relocated to Luther Burbank MS site and renamed as Small Middle School for Equity at the end of the 2005–2006 academic year)
Luther Burbank Middle School (closed at the end of the 2005–2006 academic year) was located at 325 La Grande Avenue. It is currently the home for the June Jordan School for Equity (Small public school), and City Arts and Technology High School (Charter school).
Gloria R. Davis College Preparatory Academy (closed at the end of the 2006–2007 academic year) was located at 1195 Hudson Street
Excelsior Middle School was merged into International Studies Academy [ISA HS] in the fall of 2008 allowing for a 6-12 grade school.
Benjamin Franklin Middle School (closed at the end of the 2004–2005 academic year) was located at 1430 Scott Street and renamed in the fall of 2006 as the Burl L. Toler Campus and is now home to both Gateway High School and KIPP SF Bay Academy (both charter schools).
Horace Mann Middle School (was merged with Buena Vista K-5 to form a K-8 program starting in fall 2011 while supporting the 7th & 8th graders who had started at Horace Mann)
Enola Maxwell Middle School (closed at the end of the 2005–2006 academic year) (formerly Potrero Middle School) then home to I.S.A. High School, and now home to San Francisco International High School.

K-8 schools 
Willie L. Brown Jr. Academy College Preparatory School, 4-8 (formerly Twenty-First Century K-8) (closed at the end of the 2010–2011 academic year for considerable renovations as well as academic issues.)
Treasure Island School (closed mid-school year, December 16, 2005)
Twenty-First Century K-8 (became Willie L. Brown College Preparatory 2004–2005)

Elementary schools 
Cabrillo Elementary School (closed at the end of the 2005–2006 academic year) was located at 750 25th Avenue in the Outer Richmond District. It is now used as a district office for Curriculum & Instruction, VAPA & IT.
Columbus Elementary was located at 1541 12th Avenue in the Inner Sunset Neighborhood. In 1995, SFUSD opened its first Chinese Immersion School in the District called Alice Fong Yu Alternative School.
William R. De Avila Elementary (formerly Dudley Stone Elementary) was located at 1351 Haight Street, between Masonic and Central in the Upper Haight. The school was closed at the end of the 2004–2005 school year and briefly rented to City College of San Francisco. Before the start of the 2009–2010 school year, the school district re-opened De Avila as the Chinese Immersion School at De Avila. Kindergarten and 1st grade students were enrolled for 2009–2010, with the plan of gradually expanding the school to comprise grades K-5.
Diamond Heights Elementary (currently home to the San Francisco Police Academy & PAL) was located at 350 Amber Drive, just behind the Diamond Heights' Safeway. The building was built in the 1960s hugging the Diamond Heights/Glen Park Canyon. Almost immediately upon completion the property was determined to be unsafe and sliding into the canyon. The school was closed for one year, shored up and reopened. It was closed as a public school in the 1980s. Subsequently, the building was sold to the SFPD and has been used since for cadet training.
Farragut Elementary (closed in the early 1970s) was located on Holloway between Capitol and Faxon in the Ingleside District. Sold off to developers, townhouses were built on the site.
Golden Gate Elementary (closed at the end of the 2004–2005 academic year) was located at 1601 Turk Street between Steiner and Divisadero. The campus is the current home to both Gateway Middle School and Creative Arts Charter School.
JBBP West (Japanese Bilingual Bicultural Program in the Sunset) was located at 3045 Santiago Street at 42nd Avenue for 3 years, after being housed at the William R. De Avila campus for 2 years. Due to the small size of the Santiago campus and a growing student population, the program moved to Rosa Parks Elementary at 1501 O'Farrell Street after the 2005–2006 academic year, and was renamed JBBP Rosa Parks.
Laguna Honda Elementary was located at 1350 Seventh Avenue in the Inner Sunset. Reopened as Independence High School.
San Miguel Elementary (closed in the 1980s) was located at 300 Seneca Avenue in the Excelsior District. It became home to Leadership High School.
John Swett Alternative Elementary (merged with John Muir after 2005–2006 academic year) was located at 727 Golden Gate Avenue, between Franklin and Gough. The School is now home to Civic Center Secondary School.

Superintendents 
The following is a list of SFUSD Superintendents: (additional information is needed to complete the list between 1851 and 1934)

 
 
 
 
 
 
 
 
 
 
 
 
 
 
 
 
 
 
 
 
 
 2017 – 2022: Vincent Matthews
 2022 - Present: Matt Wayne

See also

San Francisco County high schools
San Francisco Board of Education
Reading Partners

References

Further reading
 Saito, Katsura (齋藤 桂 Saitō Katsura). "New Approach for Assessing Outcomes in San Francisco Unified School District: Driving Improvement with a Balanced Scorecard (サンフランシスコ統合学区における学力向上政策--Balanced Scorecardに焦点をあてて, Archive) Kyoto University Research Studies in Education (京都大学大学院教育学研究科紀要). Graduate School of Education, Kyoto University (Faculty of Education) (京都大学大学院教育学研究科). , NDL Article ID 11184660. NII Article ID 40018924726.NII NACSIS-CAT ID (NCID) :AA11332212. 25 April 2011. Volume 57. p. 601-613.
English abstract (Archive)
 Honda, Hideki (ほんだひでき Honda Hideki) and Shihori Suzuki (すずきしほり Suzuki Shihori). "サンフランシスコ統合学区の�チャーター・スクール�1部." (Archive) Ikuyo Kaneko Research Group @ SFC (金子郁容研究会 Kaneko Ikuyo Kenkyūkai). Keio University Shonan Fujisawa Campus.

External links

San Francisco Unified School District
United Educators of San Francisco represents close to six thousand paraprofessionals and teachers in SFUSD
Parents for Public Schools - SF
San Francisco Schools blog
San Francisco History Center - history and records of the SFUSD 1854-2003

 
Education in San Francisco
School districts in the San Francisco Bay Area
School districts established in 1851
1851 establishments in California